Attorney General of Jamaica is the chief law officer in Jamaica.

Section 79(1) of the Constitution of Jamaica states that "there shall be an Attorney General who shall be the principal legal adviser to the Government of Jamaica" and pursuant to the Crown Proceedings Act all civil proceedings by or against the Government are instituted in the name of the Attorney General.

List of attorneys general of Jamaica
Main Source:

1655 English/British Colony
Edmund Ducke 1671
John Wright 1685
Sir Richard Dereham 1688
Simon Musgrave 1686–1691
William Brodrick (politician), brother of Alan Brodrick, 1st Viscount Midleton, (Lord Chancellor of Ireland) 1693
Thomas Barrow 1698
Edward Haskins 1703
Robert Hotchkyn 1707
William Brodrick 1711–1715
Edmund Kelly 1719
William Monk 1724
Alexander Henderson 1732
Thomas Howe 1732
Matthew Concanen 1732–1744
Andrew Arcedeckne 1734
Thomas Hill 1744
Robert Penny 1744–1749
Henry Morgan Byndloss 1754
Richard Beckford 1755
Gilbert Ford 1760
Edward Penny 1760
Thomas Gordon 1766
Thomas Beach 1766
Thomas Harrison 1769
Robert Sewell, 1784
George Crawford Ricketts 1796
William Ross 1802
Thomas Witter Jackson 1808-1818
William Burge 1818–1829
Hugo James 1829
Fitzherbert Batty 1832
Dowell O'Reilly 1833–1855
Alexander Heslop 1857–1866  (1855–?)

1866 British Crown Colony

Ernest Alexander Clendinning Schalch 1872 (died 1874)
George Hurley Barne 1876
(Sir) Edward Loughlin O'Malley 1876–1880
Sir Henry Hicks Hocking 1881–c.1895
(Sir) Henry Rawlins Pipon Schooles 1896–1905
Thomas Bancroft Oughton 1906–
Ernest St. John Branch 1910–
Frederick Chester Wells Durrant 1921–1932 
Maurice Vivian Camacho ?1932–1938
Arthur Werner Lewey c.1938–
T. Henry Mayers c.1944
Joseph Leslie Cundall 1952–?1962

1962 Independent Commonwealth realm
Victor B. Grant 1962–1972
Leacroft Robinson 1972–1976 
Raphael Carl Rattray 1976–1980 
Winston Spaulding  1980–1986  
Oswald Harding 1986–1989 
Raphael Carl Rattray 1989–1993 
David Coore 1993–1995 
Arnold Joseph Nicholson 1995–2007  
Dorothy Lightbourne 2007–2011
Ransford Braham 2011–2012
Patrick Atkinson 2012–2016
Marlene Malahoo Forte, 2016-2022
Derrick McKoy, 2022–present

References

 
Ministries and agencies of the government of Jamaica